Cochecton Center Methodist Episcopal Church, also known as Cochecton Center Community Center, is a historic Methodist Episcopal church on Skipperene Road in Cochecton Center, Sullivan County, New York.  It was built in 1892 and is a small, rectangular, wood-frame building with clapboard siding on an ashlar foundation and a steep gable roof.  It features a three-stage, corner entrance tower surmounted by a tall spire.  Also on the property is a former stable, dated to 1912, that was converted for use as a church hall in 1925.

It was added to the National Register of Historic Places in 2000.

References

Methodist churches in New York (state)
Churches on the National Register of Historic Places in New York (state)
Churches completed in 1892
19th-century Episcopal church buildings
Churches in Sullivan County, New York
National Register of Historic Places in Sullivan County, New York
1892 establishments in New York (state)